Boulder Peak is located in the Livingston Range, Glacier National Park in the U.S. state of Montana. The remnant Boulder Glacier is situated on the northern slopes of the mountain.

Climate

Based on the Köppen climate classification, Boulder Peak is located in a subarctic climate zone characterized by long, usually very cold winters, and short, cool to mild summers. Winter temperatures can drop below −10 °F with wind chill factors below −30 °F.

Geology

Boulder Peak is composed of sedimentary rock laid down during the Precambrian to Jurassic periods.

See also
 List of mountains and mountain ranges of Glacier National Park (U.S.)

References

Livingston Range
Mountains of Flathead County, Montana
Mountains of Glacier National Park (U.S.)
Mountains of Montana